Oxford Photovoltaics Limited (Oxford PV) is an Oxford University spin-off company in the field of perovskite photovoltaics and solar cells.

History

The company was founded in 2010 by Henry Snaith and Kevin Arthur.  the company has raised $100 Million in investment with support from Oxford University Innovation, Goldwind the University of Oxford, Innovate UK the European Investment Bank (EIB), Legal & General, the Engineering and Physical Sciences Research Council (EPSRC) and Equinor. The largest shareholder is the Swiss cell and module production equipment manufacturer Meyer Burger.

Operation

The company exploits solid-state physics using metal halide high efficiency perovskite solar cells and was among MIT Technology Review’s top 50 most innovative companies of 2017. Oxford PV is headquartered in Yarnton, Oxfordshire with an industrial pilot line in Brandenburg an der Havel, near Berlin, Germany.

References

Photovoltaics manufacturers
Solar energy companies of the United Kingdom